Andrea Pitzer is an American journalist, known for her books One Long Night: A Global History of Concentration Camps and The Secret History of Vladimir Nabokov.

Early life 

Pitzer attended the Georgetown School of Foreign Service, where she says she studied nuclear negotiations and treaties. While at Harvard, she founded Nieman Storyboard.

Career 

Pitzer was widely cited in 2019 over whether the camps where the United States Border authorities detained refugee claimants were or weren't canonical concentration camps.  In particular, a tweet where Congressional Representative Alexandria Ocasio-Cortez linked to an article in Esquire magazine, that extensively quoted Pitzer stirred widespread debate.

Pitzer was interviewed on All In with Chris Hayes, on the Border Patrol detention camps, on June 6, 2019.  According to Pitzer, recognizable concentration camps were first used in Spanish Cuba, developed by General Valeriano Weyler during the Cuban War of Independence in the 1890s. She said that while the Nazi death camps were the best known concentration camps, they have been used around the world.  She said she found that concentration camps were hard to close; how she found that authorities found them so convenient, that they were re-used for other groups.  She cited how French camps first used to house refugees from the Spanish Civil War were later used by the Vichy French to house Jews rounded up to hand over to their Nazi occupiers, and a camp at the Guantanamo Naval Base to house Haitian and Cuban refugees was later used to house captives from Afghanistan. She said her book began when she "looked to see how this idea, of rounding up a whole bunch of civilians - noncombatants - and putting them in detention, without trial... How did that get to be seen as a good idea?"

Pitzer has criticized the detention of ethnic Uyghurs in China's Xinjiang territory, considering these to be concentration camps as well. She has criticized arbitrary arrests and detention in India, Myanmar, China, and the US as "part of a single phenomenon" which occurs when authoritarians get away with abuse of power.

References

External links 
 Interview with Pitzer about her biography 'The Secret History of Vladimir Nabokov'

American women journalists
Living people
21st-century American historians
1968 births
21st-century American women